Michael Adamson (born June 30, 1971) is a Canadian painter, known for a style that blends landscape with abstraction.

Biography 
Michael Adamson was born in Toronto and studied art at the Emily Carr University of Art and Design in Vancouver. In his third year, he studied at the Kunsthochschule Kassel, Germany where he became fascinated with Gerhard Richter, as were other painting students.

Work 
Adamson's breakthrough as a painter in Canada came in 1998 when he started to compose paintings in which he used grids to mirror the material of the canvas. His painterly signature is composed of discs of bright pigment applied to brilliantly hued canvas.At first influenced by modernist painters, such as Hans Hofmann and Richter, he became in time an abstract painter using ideas of landscape with horizon lines and configurations that could be read as water and skies. His work was described in the Globe and Mail as paintings that "hover...between abstraction and landscape".

At the end of the 1990s, he began to show his work in vacant properties around Toronto. These “pop-ups” were artist-run centres which presented shows of new artists. From 1998 until 2008, painting became for him an 'open country' to which he applied different approaches in composition and application. The Open Country series (2008) included 150 canvases completed over a five-month period. A later series was called Open Road.

Adamson's works have been included in shows at the Beaverbrook Art Gallery, Fredericton, New Brunswick (Goop, Guck, And Globs: The Materiality Of Paint, 2012); the Gardiner Museum, Toronto (12 Trees, 2015); Thompson’s Galleries in London (2016); and the Couture Galleri in Stockholm (2016). In 2020, his solo show Abstraction in the Extended Field took place at the Art Gallery of Northumberland in Cobourg, Ontario. In 2021, a new series of paintings were exhibited in a solo exhibition at Thompson’s Galleries in London, UK. In 2022, his work was shown in a solo exhibition at the 13th Street Winery in St. Catharines, 0ntario.

Selected public collections 
Art Gallery of Hamilton, Ontario
Art Gallery of Nova Scotia, Halifax, Nova Scotia
Art Gallery of Peel, Brampton, Ontario
Beaverbrook Art Gallery, Fredericton, NB
McIntosh Art Gallery, University of Western Ontario, London, Ontario
Robert McLaughlin Gallery, Oshawa, Ontario
Varley Art Gallery of Markham, Unionville, Ontario

References

Bibliography 

1971 births
Living people
20th-century Canadian painters
20th-century Canadian male artists
21st-century Canadian painters
21st-century Canadian male artists
Abstract painters
Artists from Toronto
Toronto Metropolitan University alumni
Emily Carr University of Art and Design alumni
Canadian abstract artists